The following lists events that happened during 1876 in South Africa.

Incumbents
 Governor of the Cape of Good Hope and High Commissioner for Southern Africa: Henry Barkly.
 Lieutenant-governor of the Colony of Natal: Henry Ernest Gascoyne Bulwer.
 State President of the Orange Free State: Jan Brand.
 State President of the South African Republic: Thomas François Burgers.
 Lieutenant-Governor of Griqualand West: William Owen Lanyon.
 Prime Minister of the Cape of Good Hope: John Charles Molteno.

Events

January
 The inaugural Champion Bat Tournament is held, a predecessor of first-class cricket in South Africa.
 15 – Die Patriot, the first Afrikaans newspaper, begins to be published in Paarl.

February
 5 – The ship Memento sinks off East London and two 2nd Class 2-6-2TT locomotives intended for the Eastern System of the Cape Government Railways are lost.

March
 27 – The Cape Times, the first daily newspaper in South Africa, begins in Cape Town, Cape Colony

June
 16 – The railway line from Cape Town to Worcester is officially opened.

July
 Construction begins on the Cape Town Central Station as hub to the Cape Government Railways.

October
 19 – The 2,700 ton steamer Windsor Castle sinks off Dassen Island.

Unknown date
 A Dutch Reformed Church is built at what is now the town of Amersfoort in Mpumalanga Province.
 Prime Minister Molteno travels as plenipotentiary to London to discuss Britain's proposed confederation model for southern Africa.
 The "Molteno Unification Plan" is put forward as an alternative model for eventual political consolidation in southern Africa.
 Isigidimi Sama Xhosa, the first Xhosa-run newspaper, is begun in Lovedale, Cape Colony. 
 Britain admits wrongful action in its annexation of Griqualand West.
 President Johannes Brand of the Orange Free State rejects any discussion of Carnarvon's proposed confederation system for Southern Africa.
 The country's first official archives are created when the Cape Government appoints a commission to assemble, sort and index the records of the Cape.
 Southern Africa's first railway tunnel, the Hex River tunnel on the railway line between Osplaas and Matroosberg, is completed.

Births
 9 October – Solomon Tshekisho Plaatje, intellectual, journalist, linguist, politician, translator, and writer, is born near Boshof, Orange Free State.
 21 October – Sir Fraser Russell, Governor of Southern Rhodesia. (d. 1952)

Deaths

Railways

New lines
 Construction begins on the East London-King William's Town line.
 In Natal construction begins on the Cape gauge railway line inland from Durban.

Railway lines opened
 1 January – Namaqualand – Kookfontein to O'okiep, .
 1 April – Cape Midland – Addo to Sand Flats, .
 16 June – Cape Western – Ceres Road to Worcester, .
 14 September – Cape Western – Bellville to Muldersvlei, .
 18 December – Cape Eastern – East London to Breidbach, .

Locomotives
Cape
Six new locomotive types enter service on the Cape Government Railways (CGR):
 The first ten of eighteen 1st Class 2-6-0 Mogul goods locomotives on the Western system.
 A pair of Stephenson's Patent back-to-back 2-6-0 Mogul type side-tank locomotives on the Cape Midland system.
 The first of eight 2-6-0 Mogul tender locomotives on the Midland system, also designated 1st Class, all later rebuilt to saddle-tank shunting engines.
 A single experimental  Fairlie locomotive and a pair of 0-6-0 Stephenson's Patent permanently coupled back-to-back tank locomotives for comparative trials on the Eastern system. The Fairlie is the first articulated locomotive to enter service in South Africa.
 The first of three 1st Class 0-4-0 saddle-tank locomotives with domed boilers on the Eastern System.

Natal
 In January the Natal Railway Company obtains its third and last  broad gauge locomotive, a side-tank engine named Perseverance.

References

 
South Africa
Years in South Africa